A Double Dose of Soul is the second album by saxophonist/flautist James Clay featuring performances recorded in 1960 and originally released on the Riverside label.

Reception

Scott Yanow of Allmusic says, "Clay splits his time between his lyrical flute and tough tenor, proving to be an excellent bop-based improviser".

Track listing
 "New Delhi" (Victor Feldman) - 6:35    
 "I Remember You" (Victor Schertzinger, Johnny Mercer) - 6:30    
 "Come Rain or Come Shine" (Harold Arlen, Mercer) - 6:33    
 "Pockets" (Nat Adderley) - 5:36    
 "Pavanne" (Feldman) - 6:07    
 "Linda Serene" (Daniel Jackson) - 8:02    
 "Lost Tears"(Jackson) - 4:06    
 "New Delhi" [alternate take] (Feldman) - 3:12 Bonus track on CD reissue    
 "Come Rain or Come Shine" [alternate take] (Arlen, Mercer) - 3:11 Bonus track on CD reissue

Personnel
James Clay - tenor saxophone, flute
Nat Adderley - cornet 
Victor Feldman - vibraphone
Gene Harris - piano
Sam Jones - bass
Louis Hayes - drums

References

Riverside Records albums
James Clay (musician) albums
1960 albums
Albums produced by Orrin Keepnews